Asian Distance Speed Skating Championships was held from 1994 to 2015 in Asia for Speed Skating.

Summary

See also
 Asian Speed Skating Championships

References

External links 
speedskatingresults.com
 :nl:Wereldkampioenschap schaatsen allround kwalificatie (Azi%C3%AB)
 :nl:Wereldkampioenschap schaatsen allround kwalificatie (Noord-Amerika %26 Oceani%C3%AB)

 
Speed Skating
Recurring sporting events established in 1994
Recurring sporting events disestablished in 2015